Christian James Judge (born 8 January 1993) is an English professional rugby union player who plays as a tighthead prop for Premiership Rugby club Saracens.

Judge began playing rugby age 8 for his local club Launceston, representing the side all the way through to their first team.  He then joined Plymouth Albion and impressed in National League 1. Judge played for Cornwall as they won the County Championship in 2015 and 2016.

He joined Bedford Blues in the RFU Championship in 2016 and in the summer of 2017 moved back to Cornwall by joining the Cornish Pirates.

On 17 September 2018 Judge joined Premiership Rugby side Saracens initially on a three week loan. The loan was extended until January, and then again until the end of the 2018-19 Premiership Rugby season. Judge ended the season as Premiership champion coming off the bench as Saracens won the 2019 Premiership Final against Exeter Chiefs.

On 18 January 2019 it was announced that Judge would be joining Bath for the 2019–20 Premiership Rugby season. 

He joined Worcester Warriors for the 2020–21 season. On 27 May 2022, Judge would return to Saracens ahead of the 2022-23 season.

References

External links

1993 births
Living people
English rugby union players
Bath Rugby players
Saracens F.C. players
Bedford Blues players
Cornish Pirates players
Plymouth Albion R.F.C. players
Rugby union props
Rugby union players from Wolverhampton